Vladyslav Mykulyak (born 30 August 1984) is a Ukrainian retired professional footballer.

Honours
Ukraine national team
 Football at the 2009 Summer Universiade: Champion

Notes

References

External links
 Várda SE Official Website Profile
 Profile at HLSZ
 
 
 

1984 births
Living people
Sportspeople from Uzhhorod
Ukrainian footballers
Ukraine student international footballers
Association football midfielders
Ukrainian expatriate footballers
Expatriate footballers in Belarus
Ukrainian expatriate sportspeople in Belarus
Expatriate footballers in Hungary
Ukrainian expatriate sportspeople in Hungary
Expatriate footballers in Slovakia
Ukrainian expatriate sportspeople in Slovakia
FC Hoverla Uzhhorod players
FC Krymteplytsia Molodizhne players
FC Poltava players
FC Slutsk players
Kisvárda FC players
FC Mynai players
OFK Dlhé Klčovo players
Ukrainian Premier League players
Ukrainian First League players
Ukrainian Second League players
Ukrainian Amateur Football Championship players
4. Liga (Slovakia) players
Universiade gold medalists for Ukraine
Universiade medalists in football
Medalists at the 2009 Summer Universiade